Grace Palmer (born 9 November 1994) is a New Zealand actress, best known for her role as Lucy Rickman on the prime-time soap opera Shortland Street.

Early life
Palmer was born in Tai Tapu, New Zealand to parents Tony Palmer and Janine Morrell, both of whom are television producers. She is of Māori and New Zealand European descent. Palmer did theatre in high school, even moving to Sydney, Australia to take acting courses while working at a bar.

Career
Palmer's first television role came in 2014 with a guest appearance as Monique Wu on the Australian-based show Home and Away. She went on to play her most notable television role on Shortland Street as Lucy Rickman from 2014 to 2017. She made her Hollywood debut as Deb in the 2018 film Adrift starring Shailene Woodley and Sam Claflin.

Grace appeared on The Masked Singer NZ as a New Zealand Possum, getting eliminated in Episode 6.

Personal Life
Palmer has two sisters, Eve and Faith. She is also the stepdaughter of popular New Zealand television and radio presenter Jason Gunn.

Filmography

Film

Television

References

External links
 

1994 births
Living people
New Zealand film actresses
New Zealand television actresses
New Zealand Māori actresses
New Zealand Māori people
New Zealand soap opera actresses
21st-century New Zealand actresses
People from Tai Tapu
Ngāti Kahungunu people